Pavel Grigorievich Dukmasov (November 6, 1838 – February 15, 1911) was an Imperial Russian corps commander. He participated in the wars in the Caucasus and against the Ottoman Empire. He was promoted to Polkovnik (colonel) on October 28, 1866, and major general on September 8, 1874.

Awards 
 Order of Saint Stanislaus (House of Romanov), 2nd class
 Order of Saint Vladimir, 4th class, 1878
 Order of Saint Stanislaus (House of Romanov), 1st class, 1879
 Order of Saint Anna, 1st class, 1882
 Order of Saint Vladimir, 2nd class, 1885
 Order of Saint Vladimir, 1st class, 1906

External links 
 Род Дукмасовых

1838 births
1911 deaths
People of the Caucasian War
Russian military personnel of the Russo-Turkish War (1877–1878)
Recipients of the Order of Saint Stanislaus (Russian), 2nd class
Recipients of the Order of St. Vladimir, 4th class
Recipients of the Order of Saint Stanislaus (Russian), 1st class
Recipients of the Order of St. Anna, 1st class
Recipients of the Order of St. Vladimir, 2nd class
Recipients of the Order of St. Vladimir, 1st class
Russian nobility